The state flag of Alaska displays eight gold stars, forming the Big Dipper and Polaris, on a dark blue field. The Big Dipper is an asterism in the constellation Ursa Major which symbolizes a bear, an animal indigenous to Alaska.  As depicted on the flag, its stars can be used as a guide by the novice to locate Polaris and determine true north, which varies considerably from magnetic north.

The design was created by Benny Benson of Seward and selected from among roughly 700 entries in a 1927 contest. In 2001, a survey conducted by the North American Vexillological Association placed Alaska's flag fifth best in design quality out of the 72 Canadian provincial, U.S. state, and U.S. territory flags ranked. It finished behind the flags of New Mexico, Texas, Quebec, and Maryland respectively.

Design and origin
Thirty-two years before Alaska became a state, the Alaska Department of the American Legion sponsored a territorial contest for Alaskan children from seventh grade (age 12–13) to twelfth grade (age 17–18) to design a flag for the territory. In 1927, the contest committee chose fourteen year-old orphan Benny Benson's design to represent the future flag of the Territory of Alaska. Benson, an Alaska Native, was a resident at the Jesse Lee Home for Children in Seward. Until that time, Alaskans had flown only the U.S. flag since the territory's purchase from Russia in 1867. Benson's design was chosen over roughly 700 other submissions from schoolchildren territory-wide. Most other entries featured variations on the territorial seal, the midnight sun, the northern lights, polar bears, and/or gold pans. To celebrate his achievement, Benson was awarded US$1,000 and an engraved watch.

Benny looked to the sky for the symbols he included in his design. Choosing the familiar constellation he looked for every night before going to sleep at the orphanage, he submitted this description with it:

History

Russian-American Company Flag

Between 1799 and 1867 Alaska was governed by the Russian-American Company (RAC), a state-sponsored commercial company initially headquartered in Irkutsk, then St. Petersburg, Russia. The flag flown by the Company's ships and their shore establishments was Russia's commercial flag (civil ensign). On September 28 (October 10, new style) 1806, Aleksandr I, Emperor of Russia made a notation on the design submitted to him of a new flag for the Russian-American Company; "So be it", and added his cypher, thereby approving the first flag in Russia's history to be used by an Imperial chartered company. After Imperial confirmation, the ukase was heard in the Senate and on October 19, 1806, was sent for execution to the main office of the Russian-American Company (RAC), and also to the Admiralty and Commerce colleges.

The new Company flag design of 1806 placed the Imperial eagle in the upper left quarter of Russia's commercial flag. In order that the State symbol remain unobstructed and more visible the width of the white stripe was enlarged to cover roughly one half of the flag's width. The normal width proportions of Russia's commercial flag were equal thirds. The Imperial eagle carried a scroll which dipped into the blue stripe, also for more visibility, which read, in abbreviated form "Russian American Company's". The symbolism of the scroll beneath the Imperial eagle complements the official version of the Company's name "Under His Imperial Majesty's Protection Russian-American Company."

The flag flew over Alaska until October 18, 1867, when all Russian and American Company holdings in Alaska were sold to the United States.

State Flag
The Alaska Legislature adopted Benson's design as the official flag for the Territory of Alaska on May 2, 1927. The first flag made based on Benny's design was made of blue silk and appliquéd gold stars. It was retained as the state flag at Statehood in 1959.

The flag's symbolism is described in the state song, "Alaska's Flag".

Historical Flags

See also

 Symbols of the State of Alaska
 Seal of the State of Alaska
 Starry Plough (flag)

References

External links
 Catalog of the "Eight Stars" exhibit at the Alaska State Museum (PDF)

Alaska
 
Symbols of Alaska
Alaska
Alaska
Alaska